The 2022 New Holland 250 was the 21st stock car race of the 2022 NASCAR Xfinity Series, and the 30th iteration of the event. The race was held on Saturday, August 6, 2022, in Brooklyn, Michigan at Michigan International Speedway, a  permanent oval-shaped racetrack. The race took the scheduled 125 laps to complete. Ty Gibbs, driving for Joe Gibbs Racing, dominated the final stages of the race, and earned his ninth career NASCAR Xfinity Series win, along with his fifth of the season. Gibbs would also lead the most laps, with 54. To fill out the podium, Justin Allgaier and Noah Gragson, both driving for JR Motorsports, would finish 2nd and 3rd, respectively.

Background 
The track is used primarily for NASCAR events. It is sometimes known as a sister track to Texas World Speedway, and was used as the basis of Auto Club Speedway. The track is owned by NASCAR. Michigan International Speedway is recognized as one of motorsports' premier facilities because of its wide racing surface and high banking (by open-wheel standards; the 18-degree banking is modest by stock car standards).

Entry list 

 (R) denotes rookie driver.
 (i) denotes driver who are ineligible for series driver points.

Practice 
The only 30-minute practice session was held on Saturday, August 6, at 9:00 AM EST.

Qualifying 
Qualifying was held on Saturday, August 6, at 9:30 AM EST. Since Michigan International Speedway is an oval track, the qualifying system used is a single-car, single-lap system with only one round. Whoever sets the fastest time in the round wins the pole.

Race results 
Stage 1 Laps: 30

Stage 2 Laps: 30

Stage 3 Laps: 65

Standings after the race 

Drivers' Championship standings

Note: Only the first 12 positions are included for the driver standings.

References 

2022 NASCAR Xfinity Series
NASCAR races at Michigan International Speedway
New Holland 250
2022 in sports in Michigan